Mostich (Old Bulgarian: МОСТИЧЬ) was a high-ranking official in the 10th-century First Bulgarian Empire, during the rule of Simeon I and Peter I. He bore the title of Ichirgu-boil and was most likely the commander of the state capital Preslav's garrison.

Mostich is known from the 10th-century Old Bulgarian inscription  on his tombstone, found in a church (now known as "Mostich's Church") in the Selishte area of Preslav, then the inner city of the Bulgarian capital. The tombstone was discovered in 1952 by Professor Stancho Vaklinov and is preserved in the National Archaeological Museum.

The inscription is Mostich's epitaph, indicating that he was buried in the church: his remains were also found, revealing that he was relatively short (165–170 cm). The text is notable for being one of the earliest sources mentioning the title "Цѣсарь" ("Tsesar").

It reads as follows:

Mostich Hill on Rugged Island in the South Shetland Islands, Antarctica is named after Mostich.

References

External links
 
 

10th-century deaths
10th-century Bulgarian people
Medieval Bulgarian military personnel
Medieval Bulgarian nobility
Old Bulgarian inscriptions
People from Veliki Preslav
Year of birth unknown
Preslav